Růžena Urbánková (14 December 1912, České Budějovice – ?) was a Czech politician.

She was appointed Minister of Post and Telecommunication in 1969.

References

1912 births
Year of death unknown
Politicians from České Budějovice
20th-century Czech women politicians
Government ministers of Czechoslovakia